Ramaz Urushadze (17 August 1939 – 7 March 2012) was a Soviet Georgian footballer. His son Zaza Urushadze was a film director.

International career
Urushadze made his debut for USSR on 13 October 1963 in the last 16 game of the 1964 European Nations' Cup against Italy (he was selected for the final tournament squad, where USSR were the runners-up, but did not play in any games there).

References

External links
 
  Profile

1939 births
2012 deaths
Footballers from Tbilisi
Footballers from Georgia (country)
Soviet footballers
Soviet Union international footballers
1964 European Nations' Cup players
FC Dinamo Tbilisi players
FC Torpedo Kutaisi players
Association football goalkeepers
Soviet Top League players